Cramps Bay is a rural locality in the local government area (LGA) of Central Highlands in the Central LGA region of Tasmania. The 2016 census recorded a population of nil for the state suburb of Cramps Bay.

History 
Cramps Bay is a confirmed locality.

Geography
The waters of the Great Lake form almost all of the western boundary.

Road infrastructure 
Route B51 (Poatina Road) runs through from north-east to south-east.

References

Towns in Tasmania
Localities of Central Highlands Council